Butler Township is one of eighteen townships in Platte County, Nebraska, United States. The population was 614 at the 2020 census. A 2021 estimate placed the township's population at 609.

The Village of Duncan lies within the Township.

Butler Township was established in about 1867.

See also
County government in Nebraska

References

External links
City-Data.com

Townships in Platte County, Nebraska
Townships in Nebraska